Xu Zhijun (born 1967) is a Chinese entrepreneur currently serving as deputy chairman and rotating chairman of the Huawei Technologies Co., Ltd.

Biography
Xu was born in 1967 in Yiyang, Hunan. He graduated from Nanjing University of Science and Technology. Xu joined the Huawei Technologies Co., Ltd. in 1993, he served in several posts, including president of its Wireless Products, president of its Strategy and Marketing, president of its Products and Solutions, and director of its Product Investment Review Committee.

On March 23, 2018, Xu was elected deputy chairman of Huawei and became a member of its board of directors.

References

1967 births
People from Yiyang
Nanjing University of Science and Technology alumni
Living people
Huawei people
20th-century Chinese businesspeople
21st-century Chinese businesspeople